Iluta Linde (born 14 January 1972 in Riga) is a Latvian female curler.

At the national level, she is a two-time Latvian mixed champion (2013, 2014) and a 2014 mixed doubles champion.

Teams

Women's

Mixed

Mixed doubles

References

External links

Living people
1972 births
Sportspeople from Riga
Latvian female curlers
Latvian curling champions
21st-century Latvian women